Uni-President China Holdings Limited is the largest juice drinks producer and the third largest instant noodles supplier in China. It is the mainland China subsidiary of Uni-President Enterprises Corporation, the largest processed food producer in Taiwan. It engages in the manufacture and sale of non-carbonated beverages and instant noodles.

History
The company was established in 1992. It is incorporated in the Cayman Islands and is headquartered in Shanghai. It was listed on the Hong Kong Stock Exchange in 2007 with its IPO price at HK$4.22 per share.

In 2008, the Uni-President Group's operating HQ under the Uni-President China Holding Group started construction in Changning District, Shanghai.

On May of 2014, the Uni-President China Holding Group came back to Taipei Exchange to issue Baodao Debt, becoming the first Taishang company to issue the Baodao Debt.

Related events
In 2013, the UK’s “Economist” reported that researchers found that the mainland China government’s subsidy for unified control accounted for 18.2% of its 2011 net profit, which was approximately US$ 9 million (approximately NT$ 276 million).

See also
Uni-President Enterprises Corporation

References

External links
Uni-President China Holdings Limited
Uni-President China Holdings Limited

Companies listed on the Hong Kong Stock Exchange
Food and drink companies established in 1992
Companies based in Shanghai
Privately held companies of China
Food and drink companies of China
Food and drink companies of Taiwan
Chinese companies established in 1992